Honduras–Spain relations refers to the diplomatic relations between Honduras and Spain. Both nations are members of the Association of Academies of the Spanish Language and the Organization of Ibero-American States.

History

Spanish colonization

In September 1502, explorer Christopher Columbus arrived to northern Honduras on his fourth voyage to the Americas. In 1524, Spanish conquistador Gil González Dávila, on his way to Nicaragua, was set off course by a storm and landed in present-day Honduras. Upon arrival to the Honduran coast, in order to lighten the load of his ships so that he can arrive to land, he ordered several horses to be thrown overboard into the ocean and by that action, the newly established port was called Puerto de Caballos (Port of Horses). Gil González Dávila went on to found the first Spanish settlement in Honduras called San Gil de Buena Vista.

Initial conquest of Honduras proved to be difficult as the native tribes in the territory overwhelmingly resisted the Spanish invasion. Impatient of the prolonged conquest of the territory, Spanish conquistador of the Aztecs in present-day Mexico, Hernán Cortés came to Honduras with an army to take control of the territory. It wasn't until 1539 that Spanish forces were able to take full control of the territory. The territory of Honduras soon officially became part of the Spanish Empire under the Viceroy of New Spain based in Mexico City and administered by the Captaincy General of Guatemala based in Santiago de Guatemala.

Independence

In 1808, Joseph Bonaparte was installed as King of Spain and several Spanish American colonies began to declare their independence from Spain. As Honduras and most Central American nations were governed by Mexico City; New Spain declared its independence from Spain in 1810. In 1821, the Plan of Iguala declared Mexico as a constitutional monarchy. Honduras declared its own independence from Spain on 15 September 1821 and chose to join the Mexican Empire under Emperor Agustín de Iturbide.

In March 1823, Iturbide resigned as Emperor and Mexico became a republic. Honduras decided to separate from Mexico on 1 July 1823. Honduras, along with Costa Rica, El Salvador, Guatemala and Nicaragua formed the Federal Republic of Central America. In 1839 the Central American Federation dissolved and Honduras became an independent nation.

Post-Independence

On 17 November 1894, Honduras and Spain established diplomatic relations with the signing of a Treaty of Peace and Friendship. After independence a small community of Catalans immigrated to Honduras.  In September 1977, King Juan Carlos I of Spain made his first and only official visit to Honduras.

In June 2009, Honduran President Manuel Zelaya was removed by military forces and forced into exile. As a result of the coup d'état, Spain expelled the Honduran ambassador in Madrid who supported the removal of President Zelaya from power. Over the years, several thousands Hondurans have immigrated to Spain seeking better opportunities. The largest Honduran community in Spain (and in all of Europe) is located in the town of Girona, Catalonia province.

Spanish prime minister Pedro Sánchez visited Honduras in August 2022, meeting with Honduran president Xiomara Castro. They vowed to deepen the economic and trade relations, also signing a memorandum of understanding pertaining the strengthening of cooperation in the healthcare sector.

Bilateral relations

Both nations have signed several bilateral agreements such as an Agreement on Dual-Nationality (1966); Agreement on Economic Cooperation (1972); Agreement on Scientific and Technical Cooperation (1981); Agreement on Air Transportation (1992); Agreement on the reciprocal Promotion and Protection of Investments (1994); Agreement on Cultural, Educational and Scientific Cooperation (1994); Agreement on mutual Diplomatic Assistance (1995) and an Extradition Treaty (1999).

Transportation
There are direct flight between Madrid and San Pedro Sula with Air Europa.

Trade
In 2017, trade between Honduras and Spain totaled €158 million Euros. Honduras main exports to Spain include: fish, mussels, crustacean and coffee. Spain's main exports to Honduras include: raw materials, industrial products and material used for the mechanical and construction industry (mainly steel products) and the pharma-chemical industry. In 2016, Spanish investments in Honduras totaled €4.8 million Euros. Spanish multinational companies such as Mapfre and Zara operate in Honduras.

Resident diplomatic missions
 Honduras has an embassy in Madrid and a consulate-general in Barcelona.
 Spain has an embassy in Tegucigalpa.

See also
 Foreign relations of Honduras
 Foreign relations of Spain
 Honduran migration to Spain
 Spanish migration to Honduras

References 

 
Spain
Honduras